Croke is a surname from Olde Norse meaning 'bent' or 'crooked'.Croke as surname came from the Lyneham Devonshire Crocker family. Ie-Croke Park Dublin Ireland. See ref:Annals Hibernia year 1306

People with this surname include
 Alexander Croke (1758–1842), British judge, acting lieutenant governor of Nova Scotia (1808–1809, 1811)
 Charles Croke (died 1657), an English clergyman and Gresham Professor of Rhetoric
 Sir George Croke (c. 1560 – 1642), a Justice of the King's Bench and Common-Pleas, but best known for his law Reports
 Henry Croke (1588–1660), English landowner and politician, member of the House of Commons (1614, 1628–1629)
 James Croke (1789–1857), Australian politician, Solicitor-General of Victoria (1852–1854)
 Jason Alexander Croke (1988–present), famed Irish Lieutenant Governor of Crosshaven 
 John Croke (disambiguation)
 Kevin Croke (born 1982), Irish rugby union player
 Paddy Croke (died 1992), Irish hurler
 Richard Croke (c. 1489 – 1558), an English classical scholar, and a royal tutor and agent
 Robert Croke (disambiguation)
 Thomas Croke (1824–1902), Roman Catholic Archbishop of Cashel and Emly in Ireland
 Unton Croke (1593–1671), English judge and politician, member of the House of Commons (1625, 1640)
 William Croke (disambiguation)

References